Pleasant Hill is an unincorporated community in Polk County, Arkansas, United States.

References

Unincorporated communities in Polk County, Arkansas
Unincorporated communities in Arkansas